The Bavarian uprising of 1705–1706 (German: Bayerische Volkserhebung, "Bavarian people's uprising") was a revolt against the occupation of the Electorate of Bavaria by the forces of the Austrian Habsburgs during the War of Spanish Succession (1701–1714).  It lasted from early November 1705 to 18 January 1706, approximately 75 days.  Henric L. Wuermeling speaks of this as "the first revolution of modern history."

Background
By the outbreak of the War of the Spanish Succession in 1701, Maximilian II Emanuel, Elector of Bavaria had developed a plan for the Wittelsbachs to supplant the Habsburgs as Holy Roman Emperors. Allying himself with the French against the Habsburgs, his plans were frustrated by the disastrous defeat at the Battle of Blenheim in 1704.  Following his defeat, he evacuated his court to the Netherlands and left Bavaria to the victorious Austrians.  While Bavaria was occupied by troops of Emperor Joseph I, the Bavarian people rose up against the Imperial occupation.

Events
The popular uprising included large areas of Lower Bavaria, the Innviertel and eastern Bavaria. The lands adjoining towns and strongholds were captured by the rebels and the peasant uprising spread to the Bavarian Forest, parts of the Upper Palatinate and Kelheim on the Danube. A Braunau Parliament meeting was held in December 1705 in the then-Bavarian Braunau. Long before the French Revolution and early German parliamentarianism the meeting was held on 21 December 1705 in an inn belonging to the Baron von Paumgarten; representatives met of the four estates in Bavaria: aristocracy, clergy, burghers and peasants. The Braunau Parliament (Braunauer Parliament) is the name of the congress on the defence of the state of Bavaria held at Braunau am Inn convened on 21 December 1705.

Following the initial uprising in November 1705, there was little response from the Austrians for nearly two months. However, that changed following an attempt by the rebels to capture the Bavarian capital, Munich. Following their unsuccessful attack, the night of 25 December 1705 saw an Austrian column encounter the peasant army near Sendling outside of Munich.  The battle was known as Sendling's Night of Murder or the Sendling Christmas Day Massacre. The insurgents from the Bavarian Oberland were defeated and completely routed by Emperor Joseph I's troops. The number of deaths on the Bavarian side in this battle is estimated at around 1,100 men, but the Austrians lost only about 40. Some of the insurgents were killed after they had already surrendered.  About two weeks later, on 8 January 1706, the Battle of Aidenbach ended with the utter defeat of the insurgents and about 4,000 casualties on the Bavarian side. That led to the collapse of the uprising against Austria.

End of the uprising
On 11 January 1706, a delegation from the insurrection traveled to Salzburg for peace negotiations.  The delegation included Mayor Dürnhardt, Freiherr von Paumgarten and von Prielmayr, Mayor Georg Ludwig Harter of Burghausen and the farmer Franz Nagelstätter.  On 13 January 1706 the city of Schärding surrendered, followed on the 16th by Cham, on the 17th by Braunau and on the 18th, the last city, Burghausen surrendered.

Leaders of the uprising
A "list of the ringleaders of the peasant uprising" included 15 names or descriptions.
 "The Butcher of Höchenwarth, called Khurtz" today: the village of Hohenwart at Emmerting, Altötting district.
 "The host's son Engelsperg also from the Market town of Düssling" today: Engelsberg, Traunstein, and Tüßling, Altötting district.
 "Würth from Schilting", presumably: Shield in Thurn 84,367 Zeilarn, Rottal-Inn district
 "Würth from Hürsching", presumably: Hirschhorn, now part of Wurmannsquick, Rottal-Inn district
 "Würth from Imb", IBM village Eggelsberg, district of Braunau am Inn in Austria
 "The so-called old Hofpaur of Wuehrlach"  today: near Braunau am Inn in Austria
 "The court Kriessbach Naglstetter in Braunau," today: Kriebach in Hochburg-Ach, district of Braunau, Austria
 "(Ingleichen) of rottpaartete Schwaiger, court Braunau", also: Hochburg-Ach, district of Braunau, Austria
 Schiennkhhueber to Mitterndorf Court Braunau ", today: Mitterndorf in Hochburg-Ach, district of Braunau, Austria
 "The stronghold of Neuhauser Court Braunau", today: stronghold in Hochburg-Ach, district of Braunau, Austria
 "The so-called Maindlsperger dess Ambt Eggelsperg" today: Eggelsberg, district of Braunau, Austria
 "The Plündtgannser gewester Congress Secretary in Braunau", actually: Georg Sebastian Plinganser of Postmünster, Rottal-Inn district
 "The main rebel Meindl sambt of the Würth Schweigsroidt", actually: Johann Georg Meindl from Weng im Innkreis, district of Braunau, Austria.
 "The geweste Comissari Fux", actually: Giles Matthias Fuchs
 "Hoffmann", actually: Johann Hoffmann, born in Pleystein, Upper Palatinate, but at the beginning of the Bavarian uprising, settled in Tann, Rottal-Inn district.

A figure said to having taken part on the side of the Oberland insurgents was a certain Balhtasar Mayr or Balthasar Riesenberger, Smith of Kochel, a popular, legendary folk hero'' in southern Bavaria ever since. However, his existence - not to speak of any participation - could never be proved. He, so it seems, may have been invented to soothe the pain over the losses and the defeat.

References
The History of Bavaria: From the First Ages, to This Present Year, 1706

18th-century rebellions
Rebellions in Germany
War of the Spanish Succession
Conflicts in 1705
Conflicts in 1706
1705 in the Holy Roman Empire
1706 in the Holy Roman Empire
18th century in Bavaria
History of Upper Austria
Military history of the Habsburg monarchy
Rebellions against the Habsburg monarchy